Puerto Adolfo López Mateos Airfield  is a  private dirt airstrip located in Puerto Adolfo López Mateos, Municipality of Comondú, Baja California Sur, Mexico, a fishing town located on the Magdalena Bay coast, a bay known for whale watching activities.

The airstrip, privately owned, maintained and operated, is open to the public for daytime general aviation use, and used monthly by the Phoenix Los Amigos Chapter of the Flying Samaritans, who have conducted free clinics adjacent to the airstrip.

External links
Baja Bush Pilots forum about Puerto Adolfo López Mateos Airstrip

Airports in Baja California Sur
Comondú Municipality